Michael Bastian (born October 13, 1965), is an American fashion designer known for his namesake label, Michael Bastian, and his work for brands such as GANT. He has received recognition for his work, most notably the CFDA Menswear Designer of the Year award in 2011.

Early life and education
Bastian was born in 1965 in Lyons, New York. In 2010, he told The Daily Front Row that he grew up with a rifle, working at a Jamesway in the sporting-goods department selling ammo. He graduated from Babson College in Wellesley, Massachusetts.

Career
After college, Bastian moved to New York City, where his first job was as an assistant buyer at Abraham & Strauss. This was followed by positions within Sotheby's, Tiffany & Co., Polo Ralph Lauren, and most recently, Bergdorf Goodman, where he was the men's fashion director for five years. It was this experience that led him to launch in 2006 his own menswear line.

Bastian's namesake line is currently carried in over 50 retail locations in North America, Japan, Europe, and the Middle East. It was produced under a licensing agreement with Italian cashmere label Brunello Cucinelli. The agreement was terminated at the end of 2010.

In 2010, a collaboration with GANT was launched.  The line, "GANT by Michael Bastian", has since expanded to include womenswear. The collection is distributed in over 60 countries worldwide, in both GANT stores and independent retailers.

The next year, Bastian launched two new collaborations: with Randolph Engineering under the name Michael Bastian for Randolph Engineering, and with Brazilian brand Havaianas. He created a collection of 15 variations on current and vintage Randolph Engineering models for the label. For Havaianas, Bastian created four limited edition styles under the name "Havaianas + Michael Bastian".

In 2013, Bastian was again nominated for CFDA Menswear Designer of the Year, but the award eventually went to Thom Browne.

On December 1, 2020, Bastian was introduced as the creative director of American label Brooks Brothers.

Accolades

|-
|2008
|rowspan="6"|Michael Bastian
|CFDA Fashion Awards: Menswear Designer of the Year
|
|-
|2009
|CFDA Fashion Awards: Menswear Designer of the Year
|
|-
|2010
|CFDA Fashion Awards: Menswear Designer of the Year
|
|-
|2011
|CFDA Fashion Awards: Menswear Designer of the Year
|
|-
|2012
|GMHC Fashion Forward: Style Vault Award
|
|-
|2013
|CFDA Fashion Awards: Menswear Designer of the Year
|
|}

Personal life
Bastian and his husband are residents of New York City. Although he knows how to operate a handgun, he has expressed he has never fired one.

References

External links
Michael Bastian NYC Official Michael Bastian site
GANT by Michael Bastian Official GANT by Michael Bastian site

1965 births
Living people
American fashion designers
LGBT fashion designers
People from Lyons, New York
Menswear designers